Celleporidae is a family within the bryozoan order Cheilostomatida.

Classification 
Family Celleporidae
 Genus Buffonellaria
 Genus Buskea
 Genus Calvipelta
 Genus Cellepora
 Genus Celleporina
 Genus Chasmatooecium
 Genus Chasmazoon
 Genus Galeopsis
 Genus Lagenipora
 Genus Omalosecosa
 Genus Orthoporidroides
 Genus Osthimosia
 Genus Palmicellaria
 Genus Pourtalesella
 Genus Predanophora
 Genus Pseudocelleporina
 Genus Richbunea
 Genus Scorpiodinipora
 Genus Sinuporina
 Genus Spigaleos
 Genus Tegminula
 Genus Turbicellepora

References

External links

Cheilostomatida
Bryozoan families
Extant Eocene first appearances